James Lawrence Niekamp (March 11, 1946 – October 10, 2022) was an American professional ice hockey player who played 383 games in the World Hockey Association and 29 games in the National Hockey League from 1970 to 1977. Niekamp played for the Detroit Red Wings, Los Angeles Sharks and Phoenix Roadrunners.

Niekamp lived in the Phoenix area and was the color commentator for the radio broadcasts of Phoenix RoadRunners home games. He died on October 10, 2022, at the age of 76.

Career statistics

Regular season and playoffs

References

 

1946 births
2022 deaths
American men's ice hockey defensemen
Baltimore Clippers players
Cleveland Barons (1937–1973) players
Detroit Red Wings players
Fort Worth Wings players
Hamilton Red Wings (OHA) players
Ice hockey people from Detroit
Los Angeles Sharks players
Phoenix Roadrunners (PHL) players
Phoenix Roadrunners (WHA) players
Tidewater Wings players
Toledo Blades players